A list of museums in the United States by state. According to a government statement, there are more than 35,000 museums in the US.

Alabama

See List of museums in Alabama.
See also :Category:Museums in Alabama.

Alaska

See List of museums in Alaska.
See also :Category:Museums in Alaska.

Arizona

See List of museums in Arizona.
See also :Category:Museums in Arizona.

Arkansas

See List of museums in Arkansas.
See also :Category:Museums in Arkansas.

California

See List of museums in California.
See also :Category:Museums in California.

Colorado

See List of museums in Colorado.
See also :Category:Museums in Colorado.

Connecticut

See List of museums in Connecticut.
See also :Category:Museums in Connecticut.

Delaware

See List of museums in Delaware.
See also :Category:Museums in Delaware.

Florida

See List of museums in Florida.
See also :Category:Museums in Florida.

Georgia

See List of museums in Georgia.
See also :Category:Museums in Georgia (U.S. state).

Hawaii

See List of museums in Hawaii.
See also :Category:Museums in Hawaii.

Idaho

See List of museums in Idaho.
See also :Category:Museums in Idaho.

Illinois

See List of museums in Illinois.
See also :Category:Museums in Illinois.
See also List of museums and cultural institutions in Chicago.

Indiana

See List of museums in Indiana.
See also :Category:Museums in Indiana.

Iowa

See List of museums in Iowa.
See also :Category:Museums in Iowa.

Kansas

See List of museums in Kansas.
See also :Category:Museums in Kansas.

Kentucky

See List of museums in Kentucky.
See also :Category:Museums in Kentucky.

Louisiana

See List of museums in Louisiana.
See also :Category:Museums in Louisiana.
See also List of museums in New Orleans, Louisiana.

Maine

See List of museums in Maine.
See also :Category:Museums in Maine.

Maryland

See List of museums in Maryland.
See also :Category:Museums in Maryland.

Massachusetts

See List of museums in Massachusetts.
See also :Category:Museums in Massachusetts.

Michigan

See List of museums in Michigan.
See also :Category:Museums in Michigan.

Minnesota

See List of museums in Minnesota.
See also :Category:Museums in Minnesota.

Mississippi

See List of museums in Mississippi.
See also :Category:Museums in Mississippi.

Missouri

See List of museums in Missouri.
See also :Category:Museums in Missouri.

Montana

See List of museums in Montana.
See also :Category:Museums in Montana.

Nebraska

See List of museums in Nebraska.
See also :Category:Museums in Nebraska.

Nevada

See List of museums in Nevada.
See also :Category:Museums in Nevada.

New Hampshire

See List of museums in New Hampshire.
See also :Category:Museums in New Hampshire.

New Jersey

See List of museums in New Jersey.
See also :Category:Museums in New Jersey.

New Mexico

See List of museums in New Mexico.
See also :Category:Museums in New Mexico.

New York

See List of museums in New York.
See also :Category:Museums in New York (state).
See also List of university art museums and galleries in New York State.
See also List of museums and cultural institutions in New York City.
See also List of museums in New York City.
See also List of museums on Long Island.

North Carolina

See List of museums in North Carolina.
See also :Category:Museums in North Carolina.

North Dakota

See List of museums in North Dakota.
See also :Category:Museums in North Dakota.

Ohio

See List of museums in Ohio.
See also :Category:Museums in Ohio.

Oklahoma

See also List of museums in Oklahoma.
See also :Category:Museums in Oklahoma.

Oregon

See List of museums in Oregon.
See also :Category:Museums in Oregon.

Pennsylvania

See List of museums in Pennsylvania.
See also :Category:Museums in Pennsylvania.

Rhode Island

See List of museums in Rhode Island.
See also :Category:Museums in Rhode Island.

South Carolina

See List of museums in South Carolina.
See also :Category:Museums in South Carolina.

South Dakota

See List of museums in South Dakota.
See also :Category:Museums in South Dakota.

Tennessee

See List of museums in Tennessee.
See also :Category:Museums in Tennessee.

Texas

See List of museums in Texas.
See also :Category:Museums in Texas.

Utah

See List of museums in Utah.
See also :Category:Museums in Utah.

Vermont

See List of museums in Vermont.
See also :Category:Museums in Vermont.

Virginia

See List of museums in Virginia.
See also :Category:Museums in Virginia.

Washington

See List of museums in Washington.
See also :Category:Museums in Washington.
See also Museums and galleries of Seattle.

West Virginia

See List of museums in West Virginia.
See also :Category:Museums in West Virginia.

Wisconsin

See List of museums in Wisconsin.
See also :Category:Museums in Wisconsin.

Wyoming

See List of museums in Wyoming.
See also :Category:Museums in Wyoming.

Washington, D.C.

See List of museums in Washington, D.C.
See also :Category:Museums in Washington, D.C.

U.S. territories
See List of museums in the U.S. territories.

See also
List of most-visited museums in the United States
List of most-visited art museums
List of aquariums
List of Route 66 museums
List of notable museums and galleries
List of planetariums
List of zoos

Museums by type

Accredited by American Alliance of Museums
Aerospace museums
African American museums
American national museums
Archaeological museums
Art museums and galleries
Biographical museums
Children's museums
Computer Museums
Creationist museums
Defunct museums
Ethnic museums
Farm museums
Historic house museums
History museums
Industry museums
Jail and prison museums
Lighthouse museums
Living museums
Mass media museums
Medical museums
Military and war museums
Mill museums
Mining museums
Music museums
Native American museums
Natural history museums
Open-air museums
Philatelic museums
Presidential libraries
Railway museums
Religious museums
Science museums
Scouting museums
Sculpture parks
Ships as museums
Smithsonian Institution affiliates
Sports museums
Technology museums
Transport museums
University museums

References

External links
 USA Museums - MuseumStuff.com
 MuseumsUSA Museum Directory
 ASTC Science Center Search
 List Of Popular Museums In The USA